The neighborhood is the next group to which children in Japan are introduced beyond the family. Although the loose, informal groups of children who wandered through villages of the past have no counterpart in contemporary heavily trafficked city streets, neighborhood playgrounds and the grounds of local shrines and temples are sites where young children, accompanied by mothers, begin to learn to get along with others.

Among neighbors, there is great concern for face. In old urban neighborhoods or rural villages, families may have been neighbors for generations and thus expect relationships of assistance and cooperation to continue into the future. In newer company housing, neighbors represent both competition and stress at the workplace, which cannot be expressed. Extra care is taken to maintain proper relations while maximizing family privacy. Participation in neighborhood activities is not mandatory, but nonparticipants might lose face. If a family plans to stay in an area, people feel strong pressures to participate in public projects such as neighborhood cleanups or seasonal festivals (matsuri). Concern for the family's reputation is real because background checks for marriage and employment might include asking neighbors their opinions about a family. More positively, neighbors become uchi for certain purposes, such as local merchants providing personal services, physicians responding to calls for minor ailments and emergency treatment, and neighbors taking care of children while their mother goes out.

People who work in the neighborhood where they live often have a different attitude from those who spend most of their waking hours at distant workplaces, creating differences in character between the central city and the suburbs. Central city areas, dominated by the old middle class of artisans, merchants, and small business owners, generally have more active neighborhood associations and other local groups, such as merchant associations and shrine associations. The neighborhood association's activities include public sanitation and
health, volunteer firefighting, disaster preparedness, crime prevention, information exchange, and recreational activities, particularly for children and the elderly. In new urban or suburban developments, local governments might take a more active role in performing these functions. In neighborhoods with mixtures of new and old middle-class residents, it is people with the time and interest, most likely those with businesses in the area, who are active in neighborhood affairs. The activities of women and children, however, might cut across such class distinctions. The emphasis on good relations with neighbors helps counteract the potential depersonalization of urban living. Working together on community projects, exchanging information, and cooperating in community rituals, such as festivals, helps maintain a sense of community.

The consequences of economic growth are examined more closely by consumers, who by the 1980s began to demand higher-quality social services, more libraries and cultural centers, greater access to sports facilities, and more parkland. Attention is increasingly focused on the adverse effects of urban life on families: modern children are seen as more demanding and less disciplined than their forebears, who had experienced war and poverty.

Despite these problems, urban life is much safer and more convenient than in many other countries. In contrast to most industrialized nations, urban crime rates are declining. The streets of Tokyo are safe even at night, and a public campaign is more likely to urge residents to lock their doors than to suggest they install deadbolts. Public transportation is congested but convenient, clean, punctual, and relatively inexpensive. Complaints are heard, however, that railroad station parking lots are too small to accommodate all commuter bicycles. In urban areas, houses are close together; but at the same time, shops are close by, and housewives can easily purchase fresh vegetables and fish daily. Urban life is made more attractive for many by a wide variety of cultural and sports activities, including the symphony orchestra, theater, sumo, professional baseball, museums, and art galleries.

References
  - Japan

Neighborhood